Roberto Domínguez may refer to:
Roberto Domínguez Castellanos (born 1954), Mexican politician
Roberto Domínguez (footballer) (born 1997), Salvadoran footballer